YaCy (pronounced “ya see”) is a free distributed search engine, built on the principles of peer-to-peer (P2P) networks created by Michael Christen in 2003. The engine is written in Java and distributed on several hundred computers, so-called YaCy-peers. Each YaCy-peer independently crawls through the Internet, analyzes and indexes found web pages, and stores indexing results in a common database (so-called index) which is shared with other YaCy-peers using principles of peer-to-peer. It is a search engine that everyone can use to build a search portal for their intranet and to help search the public internet clearly.

Compared to semi-distributed search engines, the YaCy-network has a distributed architecture. All YaCy-peers are equal and no central server exists. It can be run either in a crawling mode or as a local proxy server, indexing web pages visited by the person running YaCy on their computer. Several mechanisms are provided to protect the user's privacy. Access to the search functions is made by a locally run web server which provides a search box to enter search terms, and returns search results in a similar format to other popular search engines.

System components 
YaCy search engine is based on four elements:
Crawler A search robot that traverses between web pages, analyzing their content.
Indexer It creates a reverse word index (RWI), i.e., each word from the RWI has its own list of relevant URLs and ranking information. Words are saved in the form of word hashes.
Search and administration interface Made as a web interface provided by a local HTTP servlet with servlet engine.
Data storage Used to store the reverse word index database utilizing a distributed hash table.

Search-engine technology 

 YaCy is a complete search appliance with user interface, index, administration and monitoring.
 YaCy harvests web pages with a web crawler. Documents are then parsed, indexed and the search index is stored locally. If your peer is part of a peer network, then your local search index is also merged into the shared index for that network.
 A search is started, then the local index contributes together with a global search index from peers in the YaCy search network.
The YaCy Grid is a second-generation implementation of the YaCy peer-to-peer search. A YaCy Grid installation consists of microservices that communicate using the Master Connect Program (MCP).
The YaCy Parser is a microservice that can be deployed using Docker. When the Parser Component is started, it searches for an MCP and connects to it. By default, the local host is searched for an MCP, but you can configure one yourself.

YaCy platform architecture 

YaCy uses a combination of techniques for the networking, administration, and maintenance of indexing the search engine, including blacklisting, moderation, and communication with the community. Here is how YaCy performs these operations:
 Community components
 Web forum
 Statistics
 XML API
 Maintenance
 Web Server
 Indexing
 Crawler with Balancer
 Peer-to-Peer Server Communication
 Content organization
 Blacklisting and Filtering
 Search interface
 Bookmarks
 Monitoring search results

Distribution 
YaCy is available in packages for Linux, Windows, Macintosh and also as a Docker image. YaCy can also be installed on any other operating system either by manually compiling it, or using a tarball. YaCy requires Java 8, OpenJDK 8 is recommended.

The Debian package can be installed from a repository available at the subdomain of the project's website. The package is not maintained in the official Debian package repository yet.

See also 

 Dooble – an open-source web browser with an integrated YaCy Search Engine Tool Widget

References

Further reading 
YaCy at LinuxReviews

External links 
 

Anonymity networks
Distributed data storage
Free search engine software
Free web crawlers
Internet properties established in 2003
Internet search engines
Java platform software
Cross-platform software
Software using the GPL license
Java (programming language) software
Peer-to-peer software